Steven Jay Page (born June 22, 1970) is a Canadian musician, singer, songwriter, and record producer. He was a founding member, lead singer, guitarist, and primary songwriter of the music group Barenaked Ladies. Page left the band in February 2009 to pursue a solo career.

Early life
Page was born in the Toronto suburb of Scarborough, in Ontario. After skipping grade one, he was enrolled in Scarborough's gifted program at Churchill Heights Public School. Page's father, Victor, was a drummer, as is his brother, Matthew. As a child, Page would attempt to play songs on the piano, while his dad would keep the beat on the drums. Page took ten years of piano lessons (though claimed he did not learn to play). He also was a member of the Toronto Mendelssohn Youth Choir.

During childhood, Page had his best friend "stolen" by a schoolmate, Ed Robertson, and resented Robertson for some time. The two went to high school at Woburn Collegiate Institute but steered clear of each other until Page spotted Robertson at a Harvey's restaurant after a Peter Gabriel concert and was surprised to find that Robertson was also a fan. This led to Page and Robertson talking, becoming friends, and ultimately, forming BNL. They were both counsellors at the Scarborough Schools Music Camp in the summer of 1988, where some of their early collaborations in music were born. Page wrote songs with his friend Geoff Pounsett and made tapes of those songs. Robertson had obtained a tape the two had made, and knew some of Page's songs.

Career

Barenaked Ladies

Ed Robertson invited Page to perform with him at a charity show under the name Barenaked Ladies in 1988, and ultimately, the show led the pair to full-time careers in the band. Page attended York University in the English program, with a minor in theory and choral studies, but dropped out to focus on the band's rising success.

Page was a main songwriter from the band's inception. A majority of the group's material came either from him alone or was co-written with Robertson.
Page also played acoustic and electric guitar (and occasionally other instruments) for BNL, both in the studio and live.

In 2002, Page won an International Achievement Award at the SOCAN Awards in Toronto for the song "Pinch Me", which he co-wrote with Robertson.

By 2004, Page was having reservations about his contributions to BNL. He has indicated that he participated in the recordings of Barenaked for the Holidays and Snacktime! despite being opposed to them. Concerning Snacktime!, Page stated, "[i]t was a lot of fun to do, but it wasn't my idea. I was along for the ride."

On February 24, 2009, it was announced that Page would be leaving the group to pursue other opportunities, including solo projects and theatre work, and that the remainder of the band would continue in his absence. The decision had been made about a week and a half before the public announcement, with one reason being the rest of the band's desire to record a new album and Page's reluctance to do so. Page believes that his much-publicized drug arrest in Syracuse, New York hastened his already-imminent split with the band.

The singer commented in August 2011 that around the time of his arrest, "the band was no longer the joyous place that it once was, but it hadn't been joyous for a long time before that. It wasn't that we didn't put on good shows, we still had a great time onstage every night," he added. "But it became a place where work was just about the stress and not the end product. And (the arrest and band tension) made me gather the strength to go out and do what I always wanted to do."

In September 2015, TMZ discovered court documents filed by Page over "The Big Bang Theory Theme". He alleged that he was promised 20% of the proceeds from the song, which included revenue generated from the BNL greatest hits album, and claimed that former bandmate Robertson has kept that money entirely for himself.

On March 25, 2018, Page performed with Barenaked Ladies for the first time in nine years at the Juno Awards in Vancouver, in celebration of the band's induction into the Canadian Music Hall of Fame. Though there were reportedly no plans to make the reunion permanent, neither side had necessarily ruled it out.

Collaboration with Stephen Duffy
As a young man, Page was a fan of British singer-songwriter Stephen Duffy, a founding member of Duran Duran and the frontman for the group The Lilac Time. Page began corresponding with Duffy after the latter replied to his fan letter. Page was ultimately invited to co-write with Duffy in the early 1990s, and several co-written songs subsequently appeared on BNL albums, starting with Maybe You Should Drive.

In June 2005, Page and Duffy released a self-titled album under the name The Vanity Project.

Solo

Following his departure from Barenaked Ladies, Page's first major project was to complete writing music for the first production of Bartholomew Fair: A Comedy at the Stratford Shakespeare Festival in 2009. During that summer, he embarked on a tour of music festivals, accompanied by Kevin Fox on cello.

He recorded the song "He's a Really Useful Engine" for the soundtrack of the 2000 children's film Thomas and the Magic Railroad.

Page's next release was A Singer Must Die, a studio recording of songs he performed in a pair of concerts, Songbook II, with the contemporary music group Art of Time Ensemble. Following the album's publication on February 16, 2010, the artists embarked on a twelve-date concert tour. Page participated in other concerts with Art of Time Ensemble, including Take This Waltz (a collection of waltzes) and a performance of the Beatles' Abbey Road album, using semi-classical arrangements by Art of Time Ensemble. In November 2011, Page performed a songbook concert, Songbook 6, featuring new compositions.

The singer's first album of original material under his own name, Page One, was released on October 19, 2010. Page toured the record across Canada and the US, including a string of shows supporting the Goo Goo Dolls.

On January 1, 2011, he performed at the NHL Winter Classic and led the singing of Canada's national anthem before the game. He also performed Leonard Cohen's "Hallelujah" at the state funeral of Jack Layton on August 27, 2011.

On January 17, 2012, Page released a new single containing two new songs, "A Different Sort of Solitude" and "Manchild". The song was included on the soundtrack of the film French Immersion. "Manchild" was co-written with Craig Northey of The Odds.

On the same day as the release, Page was nominated at the 32nd Annual Genie Awards for the composition of "A Different Sort of Solitude".

Page has hosted a television show, The Illegal Eater, in which he is featured travelling to various cities in search of underground restaurants and/or pop-up supper clubs.

In July 2014, it was announced that the singer had been working on a new studio album. The record, Heal Thyself Pt. 1: Instinct, was released on March 11, 2016.

On September 14, 2018, Page issued his follow-up record, Discipline: Heal Thyself, Pt. II.

Here's What It Takes, a musical written by Page and Daniel MacIvor, was slated to premiere at the 2020 Stratford Festival. With the production shut down due to the COVID-19 pandemic, Page has performed a weekly series of home concerts through Dan Mangan's Side Door platform. He and the show's cast recorded a version of the musical's closing song, "No Song Left to Save Me", for an appearance on CBC Radio's Q.

On December 3, 2021, Page released the single "Canada Loves You Back (feat. Odds)", which he performed at the Governor General's Awards in honour of Ryan Reynolds.

Trans-Canada Highwaymen
On July 16, 2016, Page performed a show as a member of a band called the Trans-Canada Highwaymen, a supergroup of fellow Canadian musicians, including Moe Berg of The Pursuit of Happiness, Chris Murphy of Sloan, and Craig Northey (who also performs as Page's lead guitarist at his solo shows). The band subsequently announced a tour, which began in April 2017. The ensemble has not written any original material, instead performing covers of songs from the members' respective bands.

Personal life
Page was born to an Ashkenazi Jewish mother and a father of Anglo Protestant background. Although Page's father, Victor, converted to Judaism to appease Page's mother's religious grandparents, her grandparents disowned him nonetheless. His mother's Jewish background was the subject of an episode of a CBC genealogy program called Who Do You Think You Are?

Page has been married twice. His first wife was Toronto musician and teacher Carolyn Ricketts, whom he wed on December 28, 1993. The two separated in February 2007 and divorced in 2009. They have three sons.

Page was arrested for cocaine possession on July 18, 2008. He was found guilty of possession and ordered to drug treatment and to stay clean for six months.

Page purchased a house in Fayetteville, New York with then-girlfriend Christine Benedicto in 2009, and split his time between there and Toronto, where his children reside. The couple married on July 23, 2011, and spent their honeymoon in Paris.

Page stated publicly in 2011 that he suffers from bipolar disorder. He said that he has gone through periods of self-medicating to relieve the symptoms. Since leaving Barenaked Ladies, he has been able to focus more on managing and treating his illness and has cited his sons as being his source of strength for keeping healthy and continuing treatment.

Other activities and interests
As of August 31, 2008, Page was a member of the marketing and events committee for World Wildlife Fund Canada.

As of July 2007, Page was a member of the WindShare co-op that built/owns the wind turbine at Exhibition Place in downtown Toronto.

In 2013, Page made a cameo appearance on the How I Met Your Mother episode "P.S. I Love You".

Page has also been a contestant on the Canadian game show Bumper Stumpers.

Discography

 The Vanity Project (2005)
 A Singer Must Die (2010)
 Page One (2010)
 Heal Thyself Pt. 1: Instinct (2016)
 Discipline: Heal Thyself, Pt. II (2018)
 Excelsior (2022)

References

External links
 
 Barenaked Ladies official website
 RollingStone.com review, "Barenaked Page Goes Solo"

1970 births
Living people
20th-century Canadian male singers
21st-century Canadian male singers
Alternative rock guitarists
Alternative rock singers
Barenaked Ladies members
Canadian alternative rock musicians
Canadian expatriate musicians in the United States
Canadian folk rock musicians
Canadian male guitarists
Canadian male pianists
Canadian male singer-songwriters
Canadian people of English descent
Canadian pop singers
Canadian record producers
Canadian rock guitarists
Canadian rock pianists
Canadian rock singers
Jewish Canadian musicians
Jewish rock musicians
Musicians from Toronto
People from Fayetteville, New York
People from Scarborough, Toronto
People with bipolar disorder
Rounder Records artists